Cape of St. Mary is the southernmost point of mainland Portugal, in the municipality of Faro. It is a point in the smooth curve of a long sandy beach in the Island of Barreta.

See also 
 Extreme points of Portugal

References 

Santa Maria
Faro, Portugal
Extreme points of Portugal
Geography of Faro District
Tourist attractions in Faro District